is an album by , released in 1986.

Track listing
"" – 4:34
"" – 4:11
"" – 3:43
"" – 5:39
"" – 1:22
"" – 4:16
"" – 7:48
"" – 4:53
"" – 3:45

1986 albums
Imperiet albums